Whatcha Gonna Do with a Cowboy is an album released by American country music artist Chris LeDoux. It is his 24th album and his second for Liberty Records. "Whatcha Gonna Do with a Cowboy" and "Cadillac Ranch" were released as singles. The first single, a duet with Garth Brooks, became his most successful single, reaching No. 7 on the Hot Country Songs chart in the U.S. and No. 5 in Canada. The second single reached No. 18 and No. 16 in the U.S. and Canada, respectively. The album peaked at No. 9 on the Billboard Top Country Albums chart and No. 5 on the Canadian RPM country albums chart. It has been certified Gold by the RIAA.

Content
Several of the songs on this album are re-recorded versions of songs from LeDoux's earlier albums. "Hooked on an 8 Second Ride", "Look at You Girl", and "Call of the Wild" were all originally featured on 1988's Chris Ledoux and the Saddle Boogie Band while "Little Long-Haired Outlaw" was from 1986's Wild and Wooly. "I'm Ready If You're Willing" is a cover of Johnny Horton's 1956 hit.

Track listing

Personnel
As listed in liner notes
Gary Bodily - bass guitar
Bruce Bouton - steel guitar
Mark Casstevens - acoustic guitar
Mike Chapman - bass guitar
Dan Dugmore - steel guitar
Rob Hajacos - fiddle
Bobby Jensen - keyboards
Chris LeDoux - vocals, acoustic guitar
Chris Leuzinger - acoustic guitar
Wayland Patton - background vocals
Brent Rowan - acoustic guitar, electric guitar
Mark Sissel - electric guitar
Milton Sledge - drums
K.W. Turnbow - drums
Bobby Wood - piano
Curtis Young - background vocals
Jonathan Yudkin - fiddle

Chart performance

References
Notes

1992 albums
Chris LeDoux albums
Liberty Records albums
Albums produced by Jimmy Bowen
Albums produced by Jerry Crutchfield